Jacco Eltingh and Paul Haarhuis were the defending champions, but lost in the final this year.

Jim Grabb and Jonathan Stark won the title, defeating Eltingh and Haarhuis 7–6, 6–7, 6–3 in the final.

Seeds

Draw

Draw

Qualifying

Qualifiers
  Neil Broad /  Greg Van Emburgh

Qualifying seeds

Qualifying draw

References
 Official results archive (ATP)
 Official results archive (ITF)

U.S. Pro Indoor
1995 ATP Tour